Colton James Brennan (August 16, 1983 – May 11, 2021) was an American football quarterback. He played college football for the Hawaii Rainbow Warriors, where he was a two-time, third-team All-American before being selected by the Washington Redskins of the National Football League (NFL) in the sixth round of the 2008 NFL Draft.

With Hawaii in 2006, Brennan threw the second-most passing touchdowns in one season in NCAA Division I history with 58. He holds several other NCAA Division I FBS records.

Early years
Brennan attended Mater Dei High School in California. He helped Mater Dei advance to the league championship in basketball as a senior. While at Mater Dei, he was the backup quarterback to Matt Leinart until Leinart graduated. After graduating from Mater Dei, Brennan attended Worcester Academy in Massachusetts for a postgraduate year, where his primary receiver was David Ball, who later would break Jerry Rice's college record for touchdown receptions in Division I-AA.

College career

University of Colorado
Brennan originally attended the University of Colorado in 2002 as a walk-on. He spent the year as a redshirt.

On January 28, 2004, Brennan entered the dorm room of a female CU student, uninvited, and, according to the victim, "exposed himself and fondled her," a charge which Brennan denied. Brennan, who was intoxicated at the time of the incident, was arrested and eventually convicted of charges of felony burglary and trespassing (serving one week in jail along with probation until he graduated from college), but a guilty verdict for unlawful sexual contact was vacated by the court for lack of evidence. Brennan was court ordered to take a polygraph test about the incident and passed. He later showed those results to Saddleback College President Richard McCullough. After the incident, which occurred during a period of time when CU was experiencing accusations of sex crimes and wild recruiting parties involving several athletes, he was kicked off the team.

Saddleback College
Brennan then transferred to Saddleback College in California in 2004 and helped lead the school to a conference championship. He was named honorable mention JUCO All-America, state offensive player of the year by the JuCal Transfer, and first-team all-conference for his performance in that season. He repaired his image well enough for the University of Hawaii head coach June Jones to offer him a walk-on opportunity. Looking to put some distance between himself and his past problems and interested in Jones' quarterback knowledge, Brennan accepted the offer and turned down an offer from San Jose State.

University of Hawaii

2005
Brennan joined Hawaii in 2005 and quickly earned the starting quarterback job. He started 10 of 12 games, the only games he did not start being against USC and San Diego State. He either tied or broke 11 school offensive records in what was a successful first season with the Rainbow Warriors. He led the country in total offense yards (4,455) and touchdowns thrown (35). His 4,301 yards passing is the eighth-most in Western Athletic Conference (WAC) history. Against New Mexico State, he recorded career-high numbers in passing yards (515), touchdowns (7), and pass completions (38). He also had nine 300+ yard performances on the season, including four 400+ yard games and a 515-yard performance.

2006
Brennan entered 2006 as the undisputed starter at quarterback, was named to multiple award watch lists and was voted the WAC's preseason Offensive Player of the Year. He led the nation in scoring and passing efficiency, finishing the regular season with a 182.8 rating, and completed 72.15% of his passes, the best in Division I-A.

During the regular season, Brennan passed for 53 touchdowns, falling 1 touchdown pass short of the NCAA Division I-A single-season record (set in 1990 by David Klingler of Houston). On December 24, 2006, at the Hawaii Bowl, Brennan threw for five touchdowns to break the record. (Statistics accumulated during the postseason now count towards records.) The team finished the season with an 11–3 record, finishing second in the WAC behind Boise State.

Brennan finished 6th in the voting for the 2006 Heisman Trophy, behind Troy Smith, Darren McFadden, Brady Quinn, Steve Slaton, and Mike Hart. During the season, Brennan passed for 5,549 yards and 58 touchdowns, both of which are school records, and had the highest passer efficiency rating in the nation. According to Jones, "Colt is a money guy. Colt is what I said he is: the best college quarterback in America, and he proved it tonight." During a press conference on January 17, Brennan announced that he was returning to the University of Hawaii for his senior season. He didn't feel he was fully prepared for the NFL and needed another year to get ready. He returned to Hawaii as a Heisman front runner and one of the NCAA's most prolific passers. Rivals.com named him one of the top-10 quarterbacks going into the 2007 season.

2007
On November 23, 2007, he broke the major college career record for touchdown passes, throwing five touchdown passes against then No. 17 Boise State. He threw the record-breaking 122nd in the first quarter, a six-yard touchdown pass to Ryan Grice-Mullen to surpass the mark set by former BYU quarterback Ty Detmer in 1991. With the pass, Brennan also broke Detmer's record for the player responsible for the most touchdowns with 136.
Hawaii beat Washington 35–28 in the final game of the regular season to finish with a 12–0 record, finishing the 2007 season ranked No. 10 on the AP Top 25, earning a bid to 2007 BCS Sugar Bowl against the No. 5 ranked Georgia Bulldogs.

The Sugar Bowl turned out to be a one-sided affair, as Georgia defeated Hawaii 41–10. Brennan completed 22-of-38 for 169 yards, while throwing three interceptions. Throughout the game, Georgia was able to effectively apply pressure rushing only three defensive linemen, allowing Georgia to drop eight men into coverage. This game cost Brennan the all-time passer efficiency rating that he held prior to the game. He was later quoted as saying, "This is not how I wanted my career to end." He finished the season with 38 touchdowns and 17 interceptions. Brennan was selected for the second year in a row as a Heisman trophy finalist, this time finishing in third place behind Tim Tebow and Darren McFadden. At the end of the season, he was invited to participate in the 2008 Senior Bowl, where he suffered a torn labrum in his right hip during the first day of practice. He still managed to play in the game.

June Jones
June Jones, Brennan's coach at Hawaii, had a large impact upon his career and helped him become one of the most prolific passers in NCAA Division 1 history. In a short January 6, 2008 interview Brennan said of Jones: "He's obviously done a lot for me because he gave me a chance and that's really what I was looking for... He really gave me the confidence to take my game to the next level and give me the confidence to play like an All-American." Jones was instrumental in bringing Brennan to Hawaii during his sophomore year.

Awards and honors
 2x First-team All-WAC (2006–2007)
 2x WAC Offensive P.O.Y. (2006–2007)
 2x Third-team AP All-American (2006–2007)
 2x O'Brien Award finalist (2006)
 Sammy Baugh Trophy (2006)
 Unitas Golden Arm Award finalist (2007)
 Heisman Trophy finalist (2007)

Records
 Second all-time in most career touchdowns responsible for (146). Achieved November 23, 2007.
 NCAA record for most 400 yard games (20).
 Tied NCAA record for most career touchdown passes by a quarterback-receiver combination (39 to Davone Bess). Achieved November 23, 2007.
 Former record for passing efficiency (season), 186.0 (2006).
 NCAA record for most points responsible (for season) with 384. (2006)
 Second all-time for highest pass completion percentage (career) with 70.4%. This record was eclipsed by Dan Persa during the 2011 season.
 Fourth all-time in career touchdown passes with 131, a former record.
 Sixth all-time in total passing yards with 14,193.

College statistics

Professional career

Washington Redskins
Brennan was drafted by the Washington Redskins in the sixth round (186th overall) of the 2008 NFL Draft. He was the 10th quarterback selected in the draft. On July 14, he signed a four-year, $1.8 million contract.

Brennan appeared in his first NFL preseason game in the 2008 Hall of Fame Game, against the Indianapolis Colts on August 3. He was impressive in his debut, completing 9-of-10 passes for 123 yards and two touchdowns for a 157.5 passer rating in the Redskins' victory. Brennan's success continued two weeks later against the New York Jets when he completed 4-of-5 passes for 79 yards and threw the game-winning touchdown on a 33-yard pass to wide receiver Jason Goode. He led all 2008 NFL rookies through the preseason in touchdown passes (three), passing yards (411), and quarterback rating (109.9). He went 36-for-53 with no interceptions for a completion percentage of 67.9%. He also carried the ball twice for 11 yards. He saw no game time in the regular season.

Brennan  was placed on injured reserve on September 4, 2009, thus ending his 2009 season, due to a torn hamstring and a hip injury. The hip injury was similar to one he suffered while in college at Hawaii and required surgery. On August 2, 2010, the Redskins traded for Baltimore Ravens quarterback John Beck, thus making Brennan expendable. He was subsequently released.

Oakland Raiders
On August 7, 2010, Brennan signed with the Oakland Raiders. He was cut on September 4, never having played a regular season game in the NFL.

Hartford Colonials
On June 3, 2011, Brennan signed with the Hartford Colonials in the United Football League for the 2011 season. The league suspended operations of the Colonials on August 10, 2011. Brennan was not selected by any of the four remaining UFL teams in a dispersal draft held on August 15, 2011.

Saskatchewan Roughriders
On February 28, 2012, Brennan signed with the Saskatchewan Roughriders of the Canadian Football League. The announcement was widely reported online and attracted widespread attention in its aftermath. Although he was expected to be the backup, the Roughriders later signed former NFL journeyman J. T. O'Sullivan, pushing Brennan down in the depth chart. Brennan was released on June 11, 2012.

Los Angeles Kiss
On October 29, 2013, Brennan was assigned to the Los Angeles Kiss of the Arena Football League. However, he was cut by the Kiss on March 8, 2014 after being diagnosed with a brain injury resulting from a 2010 car crash (see below). Brennan's experience with the Kiss became the focus of the first episode of 4th and Loud, a reality television series about the team.

Personal life
Brennan was a communications major. On December 16, 2007, Brennan received his Bachelor of Arts in communications and a 27-second standing ovation. Hawaii-based venture capitalist Barry Weinman wore Brennan's No. 15 jersey while delivering the commencement address at the 2007 graduation.

His cousin Brent Brennan is a college football coach who has been the head coach at San Jose State since 2017.

On November 19, 2010, Brennan was hospitalized and listed in serious condition after he was a passenger in a car crash in the Big Island of Hawai'i. The accident left him with a traumatic brain injury, broken ribs and collar bone, which according to his family affected him emotionally in the following years. He was released from Queen's Medical Center on November 27, 2010 and headed to his parents' home in Southern California to continue his recovery. He described his injuries in 2014:

Legal issues
Brennan was arrested on July 25, 2012, in Kailua, Honolulu County, Hawaii, on suspicion of driving under the influence and third-degree promotion of a dangerous drug. His blood-alcohol level was 0.17percent, more than twice the legal limit for driving a vehicle. He was released the next day without charges. In August 2012, Brennan was charged with drunken driving, but he was not charged for cocaine residue found in a plastic packet in the car. Despite entering a not guilty plea in November 2012, Brennan pleaded guilty to driving under the influence of alcohol on July 31, 2013, and he paid a $300 fine.

In 2015, Brennan allegedly filed a false police report that his vehicle was stolen, something his attorney blamed on memory problems stemming from his 2010 car crash injuries. Charges were later dropped.

On December 10, 2019, Brennan was arrested once again for operating a vehicle under the influence in Kaneohe.

On August 1, 2020, Brennan was arrested for trespassing and refusing to leave a hotel in Kailua-Kona while "heavily intoxicated". He was charged with second-degree trespassing; bail was set at $250, but he remained in jail until his hearing several days later. The judge granted his lawyer's request for court-supervised release without bail until his next scheduled court appearance later that month.

Death
On May 10, 2021, Brennan was found unconscious at a hotel room after ingesting fentanyl. He was hospitalized in Newport Beach, California, and died the following day, at age 37. With his father's assistance, Brennan had attempted to enter a detox center at Hoag Hospital in Newport Beach hours before ingesting fentanyl, but the hospital eventually turned him away because there were no open beds available, and the hospital had failed to contact Brennan's father despite promising to call him back.

In the immediate aftermath of his death, many released statements mourning his death. Hawaii governor David Ige said of Brennan: “He will always be remembered for his brilliance, his leadership and how he and his team brought the people of Hawaii together during that exciting and memorable 2007 season.”

On February 25, 2022, a further investigation revealed that Brennan had Stage 1 CTE. In addition, there were multiple substances in his system which featured ethanol, methamphetamines, amphetamines, and fentanyl in the autopsy report.

See also
 List of NCAA Division I FBS career passing yards leaders
 List of NCAA Division I FBS career passing touchdowns leaders
 List of NCAA major college football yearly passing leaders
 List of NCAA major college football yearly total offense leaders

References

External links
 Washington Redskins profile
 Hawaii profile
 

1983 births
2021 deaths
American football quarterbacks
American players of Canadian football
Canadian football quarterbacks
Hartford Colonials players
Hawaii Rainbow Warriors football players
Los Angeles Kiss players
Oakland Raiders players
Players of American football from California
Saddleback Gauchos football players
Saskatchewan Roughriders players
Sportspeople from Orange County, California
University of Colorado alumni
Washington Redskins players
Drug-related deaths in California